Ondina warreni is a species of sea snail, a marine gastropod mollusk in the family Pyramidellidae, the pyrams and their allies.

Description
Compared with Ondina obliqua, the shell of Ondina warreni is smaller, its length varying between 0.8 mm and 3.2 mm. The basal striae are more distinct, and the umbilicus is more developed.

Distribution
This species occurs in the following locations:
 European waters (ERMS scope): Atlantic European coasts
 United Kingdom Exclusive Economic Zone
 Portuguese Exclusive Economic Zone : Madeira
 Spanish Exclusive Economic Zone : Canary Islands
 Mediterranean Sea : Greece, off Apulia, Italy

References

 Templado, J. and R. Villanueva 2010 Checklist of Phylum Mollusca. pp. 148–198 In Coll, M., et al., 2010. The biodiversity of the Mediterranean Sea: estimates, patterns, and threats. PLoS ONE 5(8):36pp.

External links
 To Biodiversity Heritage Library (2 publications)
 To CLEMAM
 To Encyclopedia of Life
 To World Register of Marine Species

Pyramidellidae
Gastropods described in 1845